USS Conflict (AM-85) was an  of the United States Navy. The ship was launched on 18 April 1942 by Commercial Iron Works, Portland, Oregon; and commissioned 7 September 1942.

World War II Pacific Theatre Operations 
Clearing Seattle, Washington, 7 December 1942, Conflict called at San Francisco, California, and Pearl Harbor before arriving at Espiritu Santo, New Hebrides, 29 January 1943. From this base she sailed on antisubmarine patrols in the Solomons and escorted convoys throughout the Solomons and the Florida Islands until 2 July 1945.

Converted to Submarine Chaser PC-1589 
On 1 June 1944 her name was canceled and her classification changed to PC-1589.
 
Arriving at Nouméa, New Caledonia 4 July 1945 PC-1589 visited Auckland, New Zealand, from 10 to 21 July, then escorted U.S. Navy crash boats to the Ellice, Wallis, Fiji, and New Hebrides Islands. After the end of the war she remained in New Caledonia serving as pilot ship until 7 March 1946 when she got underway for an overhaul at Pago Pago, Samoa, sailing on to arrive in Pearl Harbor 1 May.

Post-War Deactivation 
She decommissioned 31 May 1946, and transferred to the War Assets Administration for disposal 3 December 1947.

Awards 
PC-1589 received two battle stars for World War II service.

References

External links
 

Adroit-class minesweepers
Ships built in Portland, Oregon
1942 ships
World War II minesweepers of the United States
World War II patrol vessels of the United States